Derana Film Awards (Sinhala:දෙරණ සිනමා සම්මාන)  is an award bestowed to distinguished individuals involved with the Sri Lanka's silver screen, each year by the TV Derana, Sri Lanka in recognition of the contributions made by them to the Sri Lankan cinema industry and cinema achievements. The Derana Film Awards ceremony is one of the most popular cinema award events in Sri Lanka. The awards were first introduced in 2012 with Unilever Sri Lanka has been the main sponsors of this Film festival.

2012 Derana Film Awards
Main Competition

 Best Actor  - Pubudu Chathuranga (Challenges)
 Best Actress  - Dilhani Ekanayake (Gamani)
 Best Direction  – Sarath Wijesekara (Gamani)
 Best Cinematography  – Asoka Sigera (Gamani)
 Best Picture  – Gamani
 Best Screenplay – Sarath Weerasekara (Gamani)
 Best Actor in supporting role  – Kumara Thirimadura (Gamani), W. Jayasiri (Gamani)
 Best Actress in supporting role – Anuruddika Paddukage (Gamani)
 Best Edit – Ravindra Guruge (Gamani)
 Best Sound Mix – Kalinga Perera (Gamani)

Cinema of Tomorrow

 Best Film - Ini Avan by Asoka Handagama
 Most Promising Director - Aruna Jayawardhana for Nikini Wassa
 Special Jury Mention Nino Live and Karma

Popular category

 Most Popular Actress - Anarkali Akarsha
 Most Popular Actor - Ranjan Ramanayake

2013 Derana Film Awards
The second Derana Film Awards ceremony was held at the Museus Collage Auditorium. 33 awards were given at the ceremony.

Main Competition

 Best Film - Ini Avan by Asoka Handagama
 Best Direction  – Asoka Handagama (Ini Avan)
 Best Actor  - Darshan Dharmaraj (Ini Avan)
 Best Actress  - Nirajani Shanmugaraja (Ini Avan)
 Best Actor in supporting role  – Raja Ganeshan (Ini Avan)
 Best Actress in supporting role – Veena Jayakodi (Kusa Pabha)
 Best Actor in negative role – Buddhika Jayaratne (Senasuru Maruwa)
 Best Stunt Coordination – Teddy Vidyalankara (Senasuru Maruwa)
 Best Child Actor – K.M Pavithra (Matha)
 Best Background Music  - Rohana Weerasinghe Kusa Pabha
 Best Original Music score  - Rohana Weerasinghe Kusa Pabha
 Best Singer (male) - Kasun Kalhara (Madhu Chandra Yame)
 Best Singer (female) - Nirosha Virajini (Premaye Mandire)
 Best Film Song - Jala Dharawe of Kusa Pabha
 Best Cinematic Song - Madhura Wasanthe of Kusa Pabha
 Best Lyrics – Sunil Wimalaweera (Senasuru Maruwa)
 Best Cinematography  – Miton Kan, Donald Karunarathne and K A Darmasena (Matha)
 Best Picture  - (Ini Avan)
 Best Screenplay  - Asoka Handagama (Ini Avan)
 Best Editing - Stephen Philipson (Matha)
 Best Sound  - Lionel Gunarathne and Sashika Ruwan (Karma)
 Best Visual Effects - Boodee Keerthisena (Matha)
 Best Sound Effects - Lionel Gunaratne & Sajitha Ruwan (Karma)
 Best Choreography - Chandana Wickramasinghe (Kusa Pabha)
 Best Art Director - Henatigala Premadasa (Kusa Pabha)
 Best Make-up - Wasantha Vittachchi & Upul Mahanama (Matha)
 Best Costume Design - Wenuka Wickramaratne (Kusa Pabha)

Cinema of Tomorrow

 Best Film Samanala Sandwaniya by Jayantha Chandarsiri
 Most Promising Director - Udaya Dharmawardena for Miles of a Dream
 Special Jury Prize - Vimkthi Jayasundara for Ahasin Wateyi
 Best Short Film - Ilam Hussain for Chavos

Special Jury Prize  - Between Two Worlds by Vimukthi Jayasundara

Special Jury Award for future hopes on Film Direction - Isuru Weerasinghe Mudali 

Popular category

 Most Popular Actress - Pooja Umashankar
 Most Popular Actor - Roshan Ranawana
 Most Popular Film - 'Kusa Pabha'

Derana Lifetime Award

 Lester James Peries

2015 Derana Film Awards 
The third Derana Film Awards ceremony was held at the Nelum Pokuna Theatre. 26 awards were given at the ceremony.

Main Competition

 Best Film - Thanha Rathi Ranga by Nilendra Deshapriya
Best Best Direction - Parakrama Jayasinghe (Que Sera)
 Best Actress  - Michelle Harft (Que Sera)
 Best Actor – Sarath Kothalawala (Thanha Rathi Ranga)
 Best Supporting Actor - Hans Billimoria (Que Sera)
 Best Supporting Actress – Sulochana Weerasinghe (Thanha Rathi Ranga)
 Best Negative Role – Damith Fonseka (Que Sera)
 Best Comedy Role – Sando Harris (Que Sera)
 Best Script – Sarath Kothalawala & Kumara Thirimadura (Thanha Rathi Ranga)
 Best Editor – Ravindra Guruge (Thanha Rathi Ranga)
 Best Cinematography - Dhanushka Gunatilake (Thanha Rathi Ranga)
 Best Music - Gayathri Khemadasa & Anupa Khemadasa (Thanha Rathi Ranga)
 Best Playback singer (male) – Lelum Rathnayake (Que Sera)
 Best Playback singer (female) – Uresha Ravihari (Wariga Pojja)
 Best Audio Visual – Chamith Paranavitana (Ranja)
 Best Costume Design – Methnuwan Wijesinghe & Niluka Wanigaratne (Thanha Rathi Ranga)
 Best Editor – Narada Thotagamuwa (Thanha Rathi Ranga)
 Best Art Director – Roshan Warnakulasuriya (Que Sera)
 Best Stunt Director – Wasantha Kumaravila (Ranja)
 Best Promising Film – Shameera Rangana Naotunna (Motor Bicycle)

Cinema of Tomorrow

 Best Film Motor Bicycle by Shameera Rangana Naotunna
 Most Promising Director - Indika Udugampola for The Night Is Still Young
Best Short Film – Viraj Liyanarchchi (Therkovski Meets Godot)

Popular category

 Most Popular Actress - Dilhani Ekanayake
 Most Popular Actor - Ranjan Ramanayake
 Most Popular Film Song-Dinesh Subasinghe Wariga Pojja Movie theme 
 Blockbuster Movie of the Year - Siri Daladagamanaya

Derana Lifetime Award

 Vasantha Obeysekera

2016 Derana Film Awards
18 awards were given at the Fourth Derana Sunsilk Film Awards.

Main Competition

 Best Picture - Indika Fernando (Ho Gaana Pokuna)
 Best Direction – Prasanna Vithanage (Oba Nathuwa Oba Ekka)
 Best Director – Jury Prize Satyajit Maitipe for Bora Diya Pokuna
 Best Actress - Kaushalya Fernando (Bora Diya Pokuna)
 Best Actor - Jackson Anthony (Address Na)
 Best Cinematography - Channa Deshapriya (Address Na)
 Best Script - Sathyajith Maitipe (Bora Diya Pokuna)
 Best Music Director - Dinesh Subasinghe (Ho Gaana Pokuna)
 Best Supporting Actor - Jayalath Manoratne (Ho Gaana Pokuna)
 Best Supporting Actress - Sabeetha Perera (Address Na)
 Best Comedy Actor - Mahendra Perera (Gindari)
 Best Film Song - Sira Wee Tibuna Hada Patule
 Best Costume Design - Harsha Manjula (Address Na)
 Best Art Director - Rohan Samaradiwakara (Maharaja Gemunu)

Cinema of Tomorrow

 Best Film -  Sarath Dharmasiri (Suwisi Vivaranaa )
 Most Promising Director - Malith Hegoda ( Dekala Purudu Kenek)
 Best Short Film Director - Krishan Kodithuwakku (Wiggle Room)

Popular category

 Most Popular Actor - Hemal Ranasinghe
 Most Popular Actress  - Dinakshie Priyasad
 Most Popular Film Song -Dinesh Subasinghe, Ho Gana Pokuna

Derana Lifetime Award

 Swarna Mallawarachchi

2017 Derana Film Awards 
30 awards were given at the Fifth Derana Sunsilk Film Awards.

Main Competition

 Best Picture - Asoka Handagama (Let Her Cry)
 Best Direction - Sameera Rangana Naotunna - (Motor Bicycle)
 Best Actress - Swarna Mallawarachchi (Let Her Cry)
 Jury PrizeSamanalee Fonseka for (Motor Bicycle) Best Actor - Dasun Pathirana (Frangipani)
 Best Actor in Supporting Role - Gayan Wickramathilaka (Sakkarang)
 Best Actress in Supporting Role - Aruni Rajapaksha (Paththini)
 Best Actor / Actress in a Negative Role - Pubudu Chathuranga (Sakkarang)
 Best Upcoming Actress - Rithika Kodithuwakku (Let Her Cry)
 Best Actor / Actress in a Comedy Role - Sarath Kothalawala (Sakkarang)
 Best Script - Ashoka Handagama (Let Her Cry)
 Best Playback singer (male) - Ajith Kumarasiri (Motor Bicycle)
 Best Playback singer (female) - Nirosha Virajini (Paththini)
 Best Lyrics - Asoka Handagama (Let Her Cry)
 Best Cinematography - Wishwajith Karunaratne (Motor Bicycle)
 Best Editor - Tissa Surendra (Motor Bicycle)
 Best Sound Effects - Aruna Priyantha Kaluarachchi (Motor Bicycle)
 Best Playback Music Direction - Ajith Kumarasiri (Motor Bicycle)
 Best Visual Effects - Kasun Malinda & Greshan Kularatne (Sarigama)
 Best Art Direction - Lal Hevindranath (Sakkarang)
 Best Costume Design - Venuka Wickramarchchi (Paththini)
 Best Make-up - Priyantha Wanninayake (Sayapethi Kusuma)
special Jury Prize Prasanna Vithanage for Silence in the CourtsCinema of Tomorrow Best Film Malaka Dewapriya (Bahuchithawadiya)
 Most Promising Director - Jude Ratnam (Demons in Paradise)
 Best Short Film Director - Dhananjaya BandaraPopular category Most Popular Song - Ahasin Eha (Adaraneeya Kathawak)
 Most Popular Actress - Pooja Umashankar
 Most Popular Actor - Ranjan Ramanayake
 Blockbuster Movie of the Year –PaththiniDerana Lifetime Award Dr. Dharmasena Pathiraja

2018 Derana Film Awards 
30 awards were given at the Sixth Derana Sunsilk Film Awards.Main Competition Best Picture - 28 by Prasanna Jayakody
 Best Direction  - Prasanna Jayakody (28)
 Best Screenplay - Prasanna Jayakody (28)
 Best Actor - Jackson Anthony (Dharmayuddhaya)
 Best Actress - Dilhani Ekanayake (Dharmayuddhaya)
 Best Actor In a Supporting Role - Kumara Thirimadura (Dharmayuddhaya)
 Best Actress In a Supporting Role - Umali Thilakarathne (A Level)
 Best Comedian - Tennison Cooray (Kota Uda Express)
 Best Cinematography - Prabath Roshan (Aloko Udapadi)
 Best Editing - Rangana Sinharage (28)
 Best Sound Design - Aruna Priyantha Kaluarachchi (Sulanga Gini Aran)
 Best Visual Effects - Chathra Weeramana / Baratha Hettiarachchi (Aloko Udapadi)
 Best Art Direction - Sunil Wijerathne (Aloko Udapadi)
 Best Makeup - Jayantha Ranawaka (Aloko Udapadi)
 Best Costume - Kumara Karandeniya (Aloko Udapadi)
 Best Original Music Score - Milinda Tennakoon (Aloko Udapadi)
 Best Choreography - Chandana Wikramasinhe (Ali Kathawa)
 Best Lyric - Rambukkana Siddhartha Thero (Aloko Udapadi)
 Best Singing - Amarasiri Peiris (Aloko Udapadi)
 Best Jury Mention - Sachira Wijesinghe / Lahiruka Ekanayake (A Level)Cinema of Tomorrow Best Film - Ikka by Kaushalya Madhawa Pathirana
 Most Promising Director - Chinthana Dharmadasa for Avilena Sului
 Best Short Film - Thisara Mangala Bandara Ganan Gannethi Kathawak
 Special Jury Prize - Visakesa Chandrasekaram for "Panshu"Popular Award category Most Popular Song - Mal Kalamba Langa (Dedunu Akase)
 Most Popular Actress - Yureni Noshika
 Most Popular Actor - Hemal Ranasinghe
 Blockbuster Movie of the Year – DharmayuddhayaDerana Lifetime Award Malini Fonseka

2019 Derana Film Awards 
30 awards were given at the Sixth Derana Sunsilk Film Awards.Main CompetitionBest Film: According to Matthew - Chandran Rutnam
Best Actor: Darshan Dharmaraj (Porisadaya) 
Best Actress: Anoma Janadari (Davena Vihagun)
Best Screenplay: Jayantha Chandrasiri (Gharasarapa)
Best Film Director: Sanjeewa Pushpakumara (Davena Vihagun)
Best Best Actor In a Supporting Role: Mahendra Perera
Best Best Actress In a Supporting Role: Samanalee Fonseka
Best Comedian: Bandu Samarasinghe
Best Villain: Teddy Vidyalankara
Best Upcoming Actor: Devnaka Porage
Best Upcoming Actress: Nayanathara Wickramarachchi
Lux Glamorous Star: Shalani Tharaka
Special Jury Awards for Debut Performances: Devnaka Porage of Gharasarapa and Gavin Ludewyke of According to MathewPopular Award categoryMost Popular Actor: Jackson Anthony
Most Popular Actress: Udari Warnakulasooriya
Blockbuster Movie of the Year: Bimba Devi Alias Yashodhara by Prof. Sunil AriyaratneDerana Lifetime Award'

 Amarasiri Kalansuriya

References

External links
දෙරණ සිනමා උළෙල

2011 establishments in Sri Lanka
Awards established in 2011
Entertainment in Sri Lanka
Sri Lankan film awards